The Uganda national netball team travelled to England in October 2022 for a three-match series against the England national netball team. The series known commercially as the Vitality Netball International Series marked the start of England's preparations for the 2023 Netball World Cup to be held in South Africa. For Uganda, the series was part of a larger tour of the United Kingdom that saw them play two test matches against both Northern Ireland, and Wales; followed by a further test match against Scotland.

At the 2022 Commonwealth Games; host nation England finished out of the medal placings in fourth, with Uganda defeating South Africa to claim fifth overall.

England won the series 3-0.

Squads

Match officials

Umpires

Umpire Appointments Panel

Matches

First Test

References:

Second Test

References:

Third Test

References:

References

Uganda
International netball competitions hosted by England
Uganda